Jan Hron (born  1941) is a Czech agroscientist, University Professor and former Rector of the Czech University of Life Sciences Prague (CULS).

Biography 
Hron was born on September 17, 1941; he is married and has two children.
Former Rector of the Czech University of Life Sciences Prague (CULS), and three times Dean of the Faculty of Economics & Management (CULS)

Education
 1955–1959 High School of Agricultural Technology in Klatovy – Czech Republic 
 1959–1964 Graduate Studies at the University of Agriculture Prague, Faculty of Economics & Management, concluded with the title Ing.
 1969 Received academic title CSc (Candidate of Science).  Theme of scientific dissertation: “Qualified management models in agricultural enterprises”. 
 1977 Received academic title Docent (Associated Professor). Theme of the nomination dissertation:  “Analysis and projects for organisational systems in agricultural enterprises”.
 1988 Received academic title DrSc (Doctor of Sciences) from the University of Economics Prague. Theme of scientific dissertation: “Organisational systems in agricultural enterprises”.
 1989 Received academic title Professor, University of Agriculture Prague

Professional career
 1977–1988 Assistant Professor, Department of Management, Faculty of Economics & Management, CUA Prague
 1984 – Present Head of Department of Management, Faculty of Economics & Management, CUA Prague
 1985–1989 Vice Dean for science and research, Faculty of Economics & Management, CUA Prague
 1989–Present Professor, Department of Management, Faculty of Economics & Management, CUA Prague
 1990–1991 	Vice Rector for Science and Research, CUA Prague
 1991–1994 	Dean of Faculty of Economics & Management, CUA Prague
 1994–2000 	Rector of CUA Prague
 2000–2003 	Dean of Faculty of Economics & Management, CUA Prague
 2003–2009  	Rector of CUA Prague (as of 1.1.2007 Czech University of Life Sciences Prague, CULS Prague)
 2010–2014     Dean of Faculty of Economics and Management, CULS Prague
 2015- to day  Professor of Economics and Management at the CULS Prague

Memberships
Scientific Boards, Societies, Conferences, Associations

 President of Czech Academy of Agricultural Sciences (Head of subject areas economics, management, sociology and informatics sections).
 Member in more than 12 HEI Scientific Boards across the Czech Republic
 Member of Editorial Board in Czech scientific periodical “Agricultural Economics”; & “Blue Rose” -  IBM 
 Member of the Rectors Conference of the Czech Republic.
 Member of the Czech Association for research and application of case studies
 Member of  Engineering Academy of Czech republic
 Member of World Association for Case Method Research & Case Method Application (WACRA)
 Member of European Association for International Education
 Member and contact person in Czech Republic of the European Association of Agricultural Economists (EAAE)
 Member of Accreditation Commission for Economics in HEI Czech Republic  
 Member of Academic Conference of the Czech Academy of Science 
 Member of Advisory Board to the Ministry of Agriculture Czech Republic
 Member of more than 10 Scientific Commissions & Foundations throughout the Czech Republic and Europe

Publications
352 scientific and scholarly works, including 63 research papers, 45 textbooks and lecture notes and 38 international titles.

Honorary Degrees
 1994	Honorary doctor degree from University of Plymouth, UK
 1995	Honorary doctor degree from Agrarian University Georgia, Tbilisi, Georgia
 1996	Ministry of Education and Sports of Czech Republic National Award
 2001	Honorary doctor degree from Agricultural University Nitra, Slovakia
 2002	Honorary doctor degree from Humboldt Universität zu Berlin
 2005	Honorary doctor degree from National University Ucayali, Peru
 2005	Honorary doctor degree from Peruvian Union University, Peru
 2005	Honorary doctor degree from The Royal Scientific Society, Jordan

External links 
 Message from the Rector Jan Hron
 
 Webpage Czech University of Life Sciences - Prague
 Webpage Dean Hron Faculty of Economics and Management Prague

1941 births
Living people
Academic staff of the Czech University of Life Sciences Prague
Czech agronomists